Bakr may refer to:

People 
 Abu Bakr, 7th-century companion of Muhammad
 Muhammad ibn Abi Bakr, son of Abu Bakr
 Ahmed Hassan al-Bakr, 20th-century president of Iraq
 Bakr bin Laden, 20th- and 21st-century Saudi businessman
 Bakr Sidqi, 20th-century Iraqi general
 Yahia Ben Bakr, 9th-century Portuguese official
 Bakr Ben Yahia, son of Yahia Ben Bakr

Places 
 Baker, Iran (also known as Bakr), a village in Darab County, Fars Province, Iran
 Bakur, Iran (also known as Bakr), a village in Kazerun County, Fars Province, Iran

Other uses 
 Banu Bakr, an Arabian tribe